

Released songs

Unreleased songs

References

Tamia